Kiyama may refer to:

Kiyama, Saga, a town in Miyaki District, Saga Prefecture, Japan
Kiyama (surname), a Japanese surname
Kiyama (Kagawa), a castle ruin in Kagawa Prefecture, Japan
Kiyama Station (disambiguation), multiple train stations in Japan
Kiyama Island, an island of the Amami Islands, Japan